John Lockhart Anderson (5 April 1928 – 6 April 2001), was a Scottish footballer who played as an inside forward in the English Football League.

External links

1928 births
2001 deaths
Scottish footballers
Footballers from Glasgow
Association football inside forwards
Partick Thistle F.C. players
Northampton Town F.C. players
Exeter City F.C. players
Dundee F.C. players
Wrexham A.F.C. players
Rochdale A.F.C. players
Chester City F.C. players
English Football League players
Scottish Football League players
Benburb F.C. players